The British Equestrian Trade Association (BETA) is a membership organisation in the United Kingdom which represents manufacturers, wholesalers and retailers of goods for, and other businesses connected with, the equestrian market.  It is one of the 16 organisations which form part of the British Equestrian Federation.

History and scope
The association was formed in 1979 and currently has over 800 member companies.

Governance
BETA is a company limited by guarantee, with member companies in six categories.  From the member companies, the organisation is run by a council of 22, with representation from each category. The headquarters are situated west of Wetherby, off the A661, in Spofforth with Stockeld in North Yorkshire.

The categories of membership are:
 Retail - Shop premises or distance selling
 Trade - manufacturers and distributors
 Equine - dealers, equestrian establishments
 Agent - Third-party representatives
 Associate - Not directly equestrian related, but with close links to industry
 Overseas - Retail and Trade

Research activity
BETA conducts regular research on behalf of its members, including on areas such as the number of riders in the United Kingdom and attitudes of riders towards spend in the sector.

References

External links
 

1979 establishments in the United Kingdom
Equestrian organizations
Sports organizations established in 1979
Organisations based in Harrogate
Horses in the United Kingdom